Nicoleta Alexandru (born 5 November 1968), whose stage name is Nicola, is a Romanian singer. She is best known for representing Romania at the 2003 Eurovision Song Contest.

Life and career

Nicoleta Alexandru was born in Bucharest, Romania. Nicola began her solo career in 1992 and has since toured extensively and made numerous television, radio and stage appearances. In 2003, she was awarded the Woman of the Year award by Avantaje magazine, her song "Lângă mine" was awarded "The Song of the Year" prize by București and Actualitati Radio stations, and she was awarded  Mamaia and Love Song Festival trophies for the same song.

On 1 March 2003, after a huge response to her song "Don't Break My Heart," Nicola won the Romanian national selection for the Eurovision Song Contest at Riga. In the international final, she came in 10th place. She released her fourth LP, Best Of Nicola, that same year. Building on the recognition gained from the Eurovision Song Contest, the album sold more copies than expected for a Romanian artist and was certified platinum. That year she also won "Best Female" at the TV K Lumea awards.

In January 2005, she released "De mă vei chema" which went on to spawn two hit singles; "De mă vei chema" and "Honey". She subsequently launched the video for lead single "De mă vei chema," which was filmed near Bucharest. It featured her backing band, consisting of Andrei Stanoevici, Cătălin Dalvarea, Ștefan Corbu and her ex-husband Mihai Alexandru. Nominated for her success, she faced tough competition for "Best Pop" and "Best Female" at the MTV Romania Music Awards 2005; the latter she went on to win. In late 2005, it was announced she and her husband, Mihai Alexandru, were set to divorce after 15 years of marriage. The divorce became big news in Romanian tabloids, not only because of her fame, but also the nature of the divorce and his status as a high-profile music producer.

In summer 2007, Nicola returned to the charts with "Doar noi doi". The video was filmed on location in Barcelona, Spain. Later on in the year, she released "Dacă-i tarziu," which was set to launch her fourth studio album, but the release was held back to participate in Romania's national selection for the Eurovision Song Contest. Her song, "Fairytale Story", placed 7th out of 12 songs in the national final. Nicola then went on to release the single, "Leave No Heart Behind," in fall 2008, which was written by Thomas Nichols, who co-wrote songs by Céline Dion and All Saints.

On 21 August 2009, Nicola launched her studio album, "Thank You". The first single released from the album was My Love, which was co-worked with Kord. The single has a music video, which was directed by Dragoș Buliga.

Discography

Albums 
Cu tălpile goale (1999) ("Barefoot")
Turquoise (2000)
 Vamos a Mamaia
 Domnul președinte
 Ce mult te vreau
 I Feel Good
 Freak d'a disk
 Turquoise
 Iarna (Milioane)
 Mr. Joe
 Hercules
Lângă mine (2002) ("Beside Me")
 Lângă mine
 Undeva, cândva
 I Do
 Eu
 Îți mulțumesc
 Cântec pentru Iisus
 Te așteaptă cineva
 Undeva, cândva – rmx
Best of Nicola (2003)
 Lângă mine
 Dincolo de noapte e zi
 Îți mulțumesc
 Turquoise
 Lângă mine (phantom winter tale rmx)
 Iarna (Milioane)
 Dincolo de noapte e zi (rmx)
 Don't Break My Heart
 Cu tălpile goale
 I Do
 Halimah
 Undeva, cândva
 Vamos a Mamaia
 Lângă mine (phantom rmx)
De mă vei chema (2005) ("If You Call Me")
 De mă vei chema
 Honey
 Ascunde-mă de ploaie
 A venit
 Don't Break My Heart
 Nu știam
 Power of Love
 Love Is...
 Ascunde-mă de ploaie – rmx
 Îți mulțumesc (feat. Dana Dorian)
Thank You (2009)
 My Love (Tango remix by Kord)
 My Love (white vers.)
 My Love (extended)
 Leave No Heart Hehind
 Doar noi doi
 Fairytale Story
 Omule de pe stradă
 Thank You
 Poveste
 Vise în doi
 Dacă-i târziu
 The Winner Takes It All
 Dansez
 Yeah, Yeah

References

External links
 www.nicola.ro-NICOLA Official Website
 NICOLA Official MySpace

1968 births
Living people
20th-century Romanian women singers
20th-century Romanian singers
21st-century Romanian women singers
21st-century Romanian singers
Romanian women pop singers
English-language singers from Romania
Musicians from Bucharest
Eurovision Song Contest entrants for Romania
Eurovision Song Contest entrants of 2003